Aussie Salvage Squad is an Australian factual television series which explores the world of amateur marine salvage and rescue in Australia, which screened on 7mate in 2018. The first series was filmed in the Whitsundays, Queensland and looks at salvage work, which is a result of storms, cyclones and natural disaster carried out by marine rescue experts. The Salvage Squad relies on a variety of heavy equipment, including a old ford Maverick which out performs a $100k Mog and notably an Oshkosh M1070 tank transporter. Series 2 premiered on 20 May 2020 on the Discovery Channel.

Cast
 Luke Purdy
 Jayde Towers
 Ellie Faranda
 Dan Miliauskas
 Jordan Verrel

See also
 List of Australian television series
 Outback Truckers

References

External links
 

English-language television shows
2010s Australian reality television series
Australian factual television series
7mate original programming
2018 Australian television series debuts
Television shows set in Queensland
2020s Australian reality television series